This is a list of songs written by Jeff Barry and Ellie Greenwich, either together as a  songwriting partnership, with other writers, or individually.

Chart hits and other notable songs written by Jeff Barry and Ellie Greenwich

Other chart hits and notable songs written by Jeff Barry alone or with others

Other chart hits and notable songs written by Ellie Greenwich alone or with others

References

Barry and Ellie Greenwich